The following is a list of notable deaths in April 1997.

Entries for each day are listed alphabetically by surname. A typical entry lists information in the following sequence:
 Name, age, country of citizenship at birth, subsequent country of citizenship (if applicable), reason for notability, cause of death (if known), and reference.

April 1997

1
Milton Brunson, 67, American gospel musician and pastor.
Evsey Domar, 82, Russian American economist.
Jolie Gabor, 100, Hungarian-American socialite.
Makar Honcharenko, 84, Soviet-Ukrainian football player and coach.
Jerry Pacht, 75, American judge, cerebral hemorrhage.

2
Zaki Badr, 71, Egyptian general and politician.
Al Blanche, 87, American baseball player.
Anthony Bushell, 92, English film actor and director.
Craig D. Button, 32, United States Air Force pilot, suicide by pilot.
Zsolt Durkó, 62, Hungarian composer.
Reg Lewis, 77, English football player.
Yulii Meitus, 94, Ukrainian composer.
David Shahar, 70, Israeli fiction writer, translator, and editor.
Tomoyuki Tanaka, 86, Japanese film producer, stroke.

3
Thomas Barthel, 74, German ethnologist and epigrapher.
Jerome Cosentino, 65, American politician.
Sergei Filatov, 70, Soviet and Russian equestrian.
Dan Swartz, 62, American basketball player.
John Ugelstad, 76, Norwegian chemical engineer and inventor.
Robert W. Ward, 67, American  businessman and politician, cancer.
Henriette Wyeth, 79, American artist.

4
Lawrence A. Appley, 93, American organizational theorist.
Herta Ehlert, 92, German nazi camp guard during World War II.
Sugimura Haruko, 88, Japanese actress.
Leo Picard, 96, Israeli geologist.
Mike Raven, 72, British radio disc jockey, actor and sculptor.
Vladimir Soloukhin, 72, Russian poet and writer.
Shoichiro Takenaka, 84, Japanese long-distance runner and Olympian.
Alparslan Türkeş, 79, Turkish politician, heart attack.
Rudolf Ulrich, 75, German film actor.

5
Ignazio Buttitta, 97, Italian poet.
Heberto Castillo, 58, Mexican political activist.
Richard Clifton-Dey, 66, British artist.
Paul W. Cronin, 59, American politician, brain cancer.
Paul de Bruyn, 89, German athlete.
Stoney Edwards, 67, American country singer, stomach cancer.
Allen Ginsberg, 70, American poet and writer, liver cancer.
Warren Godfrey, 66, Canadian ice hockey player.
August Heckscher II, 83, American public intellectual and writer, heart failure.
Aklilu Lemma, 61, Ethiopian scientist.
John R. McKinney, 76, American soldier and recipient of the Medal of Honor.
Riley Morris, 62/63, American football player (Oakland Raiders, Boston/New Bedford Sweepers).

6
Max Alvarado, 68, Filipino actor, heart failure.
Bernard Chevallier, 84, French equestrian and Olympic champion.
Jack Kent Cooke, 84, Canadian-American businessman, cardiac arrest, heart attack.
Stephan Hermlin, 81, German author.
Peter Jeffrey, 83, Royal Australian Air Force officer and flying ace.
David Keith-Lucas, 86, British aeronautical engineer.
Barbara Yu Ling, Singapore-British actress.
Joaquin Mazdak Luttinger, 73, American physicist.
Rosita Serrano, 84, Chilean singer, chronic bronchitis.
Pierre-Henri Teitgen, 88, French lawyer, professor and politician.

7
Luis Aloma, 73, Cuban baseball player.
Aaron Kramer, 75, American poet and social activist.
Sam Parks, Jr., 87, American golfer.
Georgy Shonin, 61, Soviet cosmonaut, heart attack.

8
Kwame Baah, 58, Ghanaian soldier and politician.
Bob Cain, 72, American baseball player, cancer.
Charles Hayes, 79, American politician, lung cancer.
Laura Nyro, 49, American songwriter, singer, and pianist, ovarian cancer.
Homer Peel, 94, American baseball player and manager.
Alejo Peralta, 80, Mexican baseball executive.

9
Mae Boren Axton, 82, American songwriter and music promoter.
Joe Coleman, 74, American baseball player.
Helene Hanff, 80, American writer, peritonitis, diabetes.
Geoffrey Hardy-Roberts, 89, British Army officer, politician and courtier.
Yank Rachell, 94, American country blues musician.
Stevo Teodosievski, 72, Macedonian artist and humanist.
Wu Zuoren, 88, Chinese painter.

10
Erik Blumenfeld, 82, German politician.
Michael Dorris, 52, American novelist and scholar, suicide.
Fred Emery, 71, Australian psychologist.
Andrew Joseph Galambos, 72, Hungarian astrophysicist and philosopher.
Alan Gibson, 73, English journalist, writer and radio broadcaster.
Gösta Johansson, 68, Swedish ice hockey player, liver cancer.
Marcel Maes, 52, Belgian cyclist.
Toshiro Mayuzumi, 68, Japanese composer.
Mehtab, 78, Indian actress.
Martin Schwarzschild, 84, German-American astrophysicist.
Francis Walder, 90, Belgian writer and soldier.
Glanville Williams, 86, Welsh legal scholar.

11
Castor de Andrade, 71, Brazilian mobster and bicheiro.
Muriel McQueen Fergusson, 97, Canadian activist, judge and politician.
Rajko Kojić, 40, Serbian/Yugoslav guitarist.
Milt Smith, 68, American baseball player.
Radovan Stojičić, 46, Serbian police general, leader of the Public Security Service and acting Minister of Internal Affairs of Serbia.
Wang Xiaobo, 44, Chinese novelist and essayist, heart attack.
Junzō Yoshimura, 88, Japanese architect.

12
Kevin Belcher, 35, American football player.
Ivar Eriksson, 87, Swedish football defender.
Nechama Leibowitz, 91, Israeli bible scholar and commentator.
Moro Lorenzo, Filipino basketball player and executive.
Dorothy Norman, 92, American photographer, writer, and arts patron.
Eric Pearce, 92, Australian broadcaster.
James Ross, 85, Scottish surgeon.
George Wald, 90, American scientist and recipient of the Nobel Prize in Physiology or Medicine.

13
Mustafa Amin or Mostafa Amin, 83, Egyptian columnist and journalist.
Madhava Ashish, 77, British-Indian spiritualist, mystic, writer and agriculturist.
Dorothy Frooks, 101, American author, lawyer, and suffragist.
David McCord, 99, American poet.
Shuhei Nishida, 86, Japanese Olympic pole vaulter, heart failure.
Harry Rosenberg, 88, American baseball player.
Voldemar Väli, 94, EstonianGreco-Roman wrestler and Olympic medalist.

14
Gerda Christian, 83, German private secretary of Adolf Hitler during World War II, cancer.
Count Geoffrey Potocki de Montalk, 93, New Zealand poet, polemicist and pretender to the Polish throne.
Kit Denton, 68, Australian writer and broadcaster.
Gus Dugas, 90, Canadian-born baseball outfielder.
John Jennings, 94, English footballer.
Michael Stroka, 58, American television actor, kidney cancer.
Walter Taylor, 84, American anthropologist and archaeologist.
Finn Wold, 69, Norwegian-American biochemist, cancer.

15
Don Bexley, 87, American actor and comedian, heart and kidney failure.
L. Brent Bozell, Jr., 71, American conservative activist and Roman Catholic writer.
David Dockendorf, 73, American sound engineer.
Zdeněk Mlynář, 66, Czech politic writer, political analyst and lawyer.
Sam Moskowitz, 76, American writer, critic, and science fiction historian.
Harry Nicholas, 92, British trade unionist.
Kō Nishimura, 74, Japanese actor.
Sipan Shiraz, 29, Armenian poet, sculptor and painter.
Carlos Enrique Taboada, 67, Mexican screenwriter and director.
Richard Tousey, 88, American astronomer, pneumonia.

16
Doris Angleton, 46, American socialite and murder victim, shot.
Jan Bruins, 56, Dutch motorcycle road racer.
Esmeralda Arboleda Cadavid, 76, Colombian activist, politician and diplomat, kidney failure.
Kenneth Edward Gentry, 36, American criminal, execution by lethal injection.
Thaddeus Golas, 72, American writer.
Doug McMahon, 79, Canadian soccer player.
Emilio Azcárraga Milmo, 66, Mexican newspaper publisher, pancreatic cancer.
Roland Topor, 59, French graphic artist, author and actor, cerebral hemorrhage.
Claude Tresmontant, 71, French philosopher, hellenist and theologian.

17
Mitsu Arakawa, 69, American professional wrestler, heart failure.
Dale Burnett, 88, American gridiron football player.
Tom Franckhauser, 59, American gridiron football player, heart attack.
Allan Francovich, 56, American film maker, heart attack.
Chaim Herzog, 78, Israeli politician, general, and author.
Henry George Lang, 78, New Zealand economist, university professor and company director.
Gérard Lecomte, 70, French arabist.
Biju Patnaik, 81, Indian politician, aviator and businessman.
Mary French Rockefeller, 86, American heiress, socialite and philanthropist.
Hena Rodríguez, 81, Colombian sculptor.

18
Rolf Andersson, 67, Swedish football player.
Edward Barker, 46, English cartoonist.
Bob Carpenter, 79, American basketball player.
Herbert Czaja, 82, German politician.
Jeanne Hoban, 72, British Trotskyist, Alzheimer's disease.
Francis Johnson, 86, American basketball player.
Don Pietromonaco, 61, American actor and radio personality, complications from emphysema.
Eddie Quigley, 75, English football player and manager.
Juan Félix Sánchez, 95, Venezuelan folk artist.

19
Walter Gordon, 77, United States Army soldier during World War II.
Eldon Hoke, 39, American musician, railroad accident.
Carl Walter Liner, 82, Swiss painter.
Alexander Slawik, 96, German nazi cryptographer and Japanese ethnologist.
Maria Wittek, 97, Polish officer during World War II.

20
Eva Blanco, 16, Spanish girl and murder victim, stabbed.
Pai Hsiao-yen, 16, Taiwanese girl and murder victim, murdered.
Jean Louis, 89, French-American costume designer.
Henry Mucci, 88, United States Army Rangers colonel, stroke.
Sun Ma Sze Tsang, 80, Cantonese opera singer and actor in Hong Kong.
Henri Vilbert, 93, French actor.

21
Alfred Bailey, 92, Canadian poet, anthropologist and ethno-historian.
Diosdado Macapagal, 86, President of the Philippines and poet, heart failure and pneumonia.
Thomas H. D. Mahoney, 83, American professor and politician.
Sayed Mekawy, 69, Egyptian singer and composer.
József Mészáros, 74, Hungarian football player and football manager.
Andrés Rodríguez, 73, President of Paraguay (1989–1993), cancer.
Magda Staudinger, 94, Latvian biologist and botanist.
Aníbal Tarabini, 55, Argentine football player, traffic accident.
Nicolas Eugene Walsh, 80, American prelate of the Roman Catholic Church.
Herbert Zipper, 92, Austrian-American composer, conductor, and Dachau concentration camp inmate.

22
Jean Carlu, 96, French graphic designer.
Néstor Cerpa Cartolini, 43, Peruvian communist and revolutionary, killed in action.
Moelwyn Merchant, 83, Welsh academic, novelist, sculptor, poet and Anglican priest.
Elliott Merrick, 91, American author.
Pete Petrow, 72, Canadian football player.

23
Thomas Carr, 89, American actor and film director.
Denis Compton, 78, English cricketer, sepsis.
Esther Schiff Goldfrank, 100/101, American anthropologist.
Dorothy Hill, 89, Australian geologist and palaeontologist.
Camillo Ripamonti, 77, Italian politician and engineer.
Beatrice Seear, Baroness Seear, 83, British social scientist and politician.
Inge Viermetz, 89, Nazi Germany official.

24
Abdurakhman Avtorkhanov, 88, Soviet/Chechen historian and writer.
John A. Brown Jr., 35, American convicted murderer, execution by lethal injection.
Robert Erickson, 80, American composer and author, polymyositis.
Felice Ippolito, 81, Italian geologist and politician.
Bill McArthur, 78, American football player and coach.
Hubert McLean, 89, New Zealand rugby player.
Eugene Stoner, 74, American firearms designer, cancer.

25
Aleksejs Auziņš, 86, Latvian football and ice hockey player.
Nicholas Baker, 58, British politician and minister.
Lidia Istrati, 55, Moldovan writer and politician.
Frank Joyner, 78, Scottish football player and manager.
Brian May, 62, Australian film composer (Mad Max) and conductor, heart attack.
Pat Paulsen, 69, American comedian and satirist, complications of pneumonia and kidney failure.
Gino Pernice, 69, Italian actor.
Dudley Pope, 71, British writer .
Andreas Rett, 73, Austrian neurologist and author.
Bernard Vonnegut, 82, American atmospheric scientist, cancer.
Joan Yarde-Buller, 89, English socialite.
Nikolai Yegorov, 45, Russian politician, lung cancer.
Chia-Shun Yih, 78, Chinese-American engineer and physicist, heart failure.

26
John Beal, 87, American actor, stroke.
J. J. Colledge, 89, British naval historian and author.
Wilhelm Crinius, 76, German Luftwaffe flying ace during World War II.
Joey Faye, American comedian and actor.
Hideo Fujimoto, 78, Japanese baseball pitcher, heart attack.
Valery Obodzinsky, 55, Soviet and Russian tenor, heart attack.
Howard Ensign Simmons, Jr., 67, American chemist.
Peng Zhen, 94, Chinese politician and chairman of the NPCSC (1983–1988).

27
Lew Dietz, 90, American writer.
Gabriel Figueroa, 90, Mexican cinematographer.
Paul Lambert, 74, American actor.
Dulce María Loynaz, 94, Cuban poet, and is, cancer.
Bunny Roger, 85, English couturier and socialite.
Piotr Skrzynecki, 66, Polish choreographer, director and cabaret impresario, cancer.
Peter Winch, 71, British philosopher.

28
Peter Tali Coleman, 77, Samoan Governor of American Samoa (1956–1961; 1978–1985; 1989–1993), liver cancer.
Steve Conte, 77, Italian-American actor, Alzheimer's disease.
Ashley Harvey-Walker, 52, English cricketer (Derbyshire County Cricket Club), murdered.
Una Johnson, 91, American curator and art historian.
Ann Petry, 88, American children's author, novelist and journalist.
William Percy Rogers, 82, Australian zoologist.
John P. Snyder, 71, American cartographer.
Peter Taylor, Baron Taylor of Gosforth, 66, British Lord Chief Justice of England (1992-1996), cancer.
Doc Urich, 68, American football player and coach, heart attack.

29
Keith Ferguson, 50, American bass guitarist, liver failure.
Georgy Klimov, 68, Russian linguist.
Günther Laukien, 72, German physicist and entrepreneur.
R. N. Malhotra, 71, Indian banker.
Mike Royko, 64, American newspaper columnist, brain aneurysm.

30
Miklós Fodor, 88, Hungarian field handball player and Olympian.
Michael Harbottle, 80, British Army officer.
Josiah Lincoln Lowe, 92, American mycologist.
Jorge Mondragón, 93, Mexican actor.
Henry Gilford Picard, 90, American golfer.
Roohangiz Saminejad, 80, Iranian actress.
Wolfgang Späte, 85, German Luftwaffe flying ace during World War II.
Vladimir Sukharev, 72, Soviet sprinter and Olympian.

References 

1997-04
 04